Douglas Cain Kelly (born 30 May 1934) is an English former professional footballer who played as a striker for Barnsley, Bradford City and Chesterfield.

References

1934 births
Living people
English footballers
Barnsley F.C. players
Bradford City A.F.C. players
Chesterfield F.C. players
English Football League players
Association football forwards
Footballers from Barnsley